In enzymology, an arylacetonitrilase is an enzyme that catalyzes the chemical reaction

4-chlorophenylacetonitrile + 2 H2O  4-chlorophenylacetate + NH3

Thus, the two substrates of this enzyme are 4-chlorophenylacetonitrile and H2O, whereas its two products are 4-chlorophenylacetate and NH3.

This enzyme belongs to the family of hydrolases, those acting on carbon-nitrogen bonds other than peptide bonds, specifically in nitriles.  The systematic name of this enzyme class is arylacetonitrile aminohydrolase. This enzyme participates in cyanoamino acid metabolism.

References

 
 

EC 3.5.5
Enzymes of unknown structure